William Sale may refer to:
 William Sale Jr., professor of English at Cornell University
 William W. Sale, mayor of Charleston, South Carolina